Buckeye Local School District may refer to:

Buckeye Local School District (Ashtabula County), Ashtabula County, Ohio
Buckeye Central Local School District, Crawford County, Ohio
Buckeye Valley Local School District, Delaware County, Ohio
Buckeye Local School District (Jefferson County), Jefferson County, Ohio
Buckeye Local School District (Medina County), Medina County, Ohio